Selston F.C. is a football club based in Selston, Nottinghamshire.

History
The club was formed in 1968 as a Sunday league club, only moving to the senior game in 1986 when they joined the Central Midlands League (CMFL). They left in 1992 for the Midlands Regional Alliance (MRA), but rejoined the CMFL in 1997. They won promotion to the Supreme Division in 1999 but were relegated back to the Premier in 2002.

The first team was disbanded for three years from 2003 as the club focused on its youth set-up, but in 2006 they re-joined the MRA, winning the Division Two title in 2008 before moving to the Nottinghamshire Senior League in 2011. In 2015 they rejoined the Central Midlands League, winning the South Division title in 2016 and 2017, and were promoted to the East Midlands Counties League.

At the end of the 2020–21 season the club were transferred to the Premier Division North of the United Counties League.

Honours
East Midlands Counties League
Champions 2018–19
Nottinghamshire Senior League
Champions 2013-14
Central Midlands League South Division
Champions 2015-16, 2016–17
Central Midlands League Challenge Cup
Winners 2016-17

Records
FA Vase
First qualifying round, 2000–01

References

External links
 Official Website

Football clubs in Nottinghamshire
Football clubs in England
Central Midlands Football League
East Midlands Counties Football League
Nottinghamshire Senior League
Midlands Regional Alliance
Midland Football League
United Counties League